Shahaboddin Azizi Khadem (born 1977 in Pol-e Dokhtar) is an Iranian sports executive and administrator. On February 28, 2021, he became the president of the Football Federation of Iran by a majority of votes. He worked in the Ministry of Welfare and Social Security and was also the parliamentary and legal deputy minister of respective ministry.

He was removed from the office of president of the Iran Football Federation on February 17, 2022.

References 

Living people
Presidents of Iranian Football Federation 
Association football executives
1978 births
People from Lorestan Province
Iranian sports executives and administrators